Chits are a type of wargame counter that are generally not directly representational but used for the following purposes:

 Tracking, being placed on a numeric runner to indicate turn status, as in some rule variants for Squad Leader. In Axis & Allies Revised Edition, chits can be used to track air unit movement, indicating how many spaces fighters or bombers can move after combat.
 Randomization or chit drawing, as in Air Baron, where at the start of each round, one color-coded chit per player is placed in a cup.  The chits are drawn sequentially to determine the current order of play.  Chit drawing is also used in Air Baron to pay income.  Every purchased airline spoke, plus all hubs, have a unique chit placed in a cup. At the start of every turn, the player randomly draws two chits, paying the owner appropriately. Chits are replaced at the end of each round.
 Fog of war, with some chits marked with question marks or placed over unit chits, allowing the opposing player to see where opposing forces are but hiding the type of unit.
 Terrain attributes, where numeric chits are randomly distributed over the terrain to indicate the frequency that resources are available in The Settlers of Catan.

Examples
Advanced Squad Leader: solid red and solid black coloured chits are drawn to determine battery access for offboard artillery.
Ambush!: lettered chits are drawn to determine the order in which individual game characters may receive turns.
Sniper!: used coloured chits with numbers on them to determine which side received a turn, and which game characters on that side, by comparing a recorded activation level against the number on the chit.

Board wargames